Henry Roper was an Anglican priest in Ireland during the 19th century.

Roper was  educated at Trinity College, Dublin. He was  Dean of Clonmacnoise  from 1811 until his death.

References

Alumni of Trinity College Dublin
Deans of Clonmacnoise
Church of Ireland priests
19th-century Irish Anglican priests
1847 deaths
Year of birth missing